Pleocoma linsleyi is a beetle of the Rain beetle family. It was named in honor of American entomologist Earle Gorton Linsley

References

External links
 Pleocoma linsleyi at the Encyclopedia of Life
 Pleocoma linsleyi at BugGuide

Scarabaeiformia
Beetles described in 1971